The  (abbreviation: ASS) is a private school in the districts of Westend and Nieder-Erlenbach of Frankfurt am Main, Germany.

History

The school is named after Anna Schmidt (1852–1929). Since 1979, it has been a UNESCO project school and a full-time school. The school has approximately 95 teachers, 20 educators and 1,280 students. 

In the academic year of 2003/2004, the duration of training to reach the Abitur was reduced to eight years, deviating from the usual procedure in Germany where secondary education ends after nine years.

References

External links 

 Official website from  

Gymnasiums in Germany
Montessori schools in Germany
Educational institutions established in 1886
1886 establishments in Germany
Schools in Frankfurt